Mělnické Vtelno is a municipality and village in Mělník District in the Central Bohemian Region of the Czech Republic. It has about 1,000 inhabitants.

Administrative parts
Villages of Radouň and Vysoká Libeň are administrative parts of Mělnické Vtelno.

References

Villages in Mělník District